Pui To (Chinese: 杯渡) was a Buddhist monk living at the time of the Liu Song Dynasty in the Southern and Northern Dynasties.

The legend has it that he once went to Tuen Mun in the New Territories of Hong Kong to construct roads, and he lived at a big cave at the present day Castle Peak. It is believed that the Tsing Shan Monastery, the Pui To stop of the MTR light rail and the Pui To Road of Hong Kong are named after him.

References 

This article draws some information from the corresponding article in Chinese Wikipedia.

Year of birth unknown
Year of death unknown
Liu Song Buddhist monks